Lal Mohan Hansda (born 3 December 1983 in Jharkhand) is an Indian football player who plays as a forward for Prayag United S.C. in the I-League.

Career
Before playing for Prayag United S.C. Hansda played for the Jharkhand football team in the Santosh Trophy for many years, and then the Railways football team in the 2012 Santosh Trophy. Hansda also played club football for the South Eastern Railways for which he won the Inter-Railway Football Championship in 2007 after defeating South East Central Railway 2–0 with Hansda scoring the second goal for South Eastern Railway. He also played for Pathachakra in the fifth division of Kolkata Football before joining Prayag United.

Prayag United
In September 2012, Hansda signed with Prayag United of the I-League. On 27 January 2013 Hansda made his debut for the club in the I-League against Mohun Bagan when he came on for Kayne Vincent in the 67th minute as Prayag United went on to draw the match 1–1.

Career statistics

Club
Statistics accurate as of 25 March 2013

References

External links 
 I-League Profile.

1983 births
Santali people
Living people
Footballers from Jharkhand
I-League players
Association football forwards
Indian footballers
United SC players